The Queensway Government Office Building is a skyscraper located in the Admiralty district of Hong Kong near Admiralty station. The building was completed in 1985. It was designed by Mr K.M. Tseng of the Architectural Services Department. The Queensway Government Offices, which stands as the 54th-tallest building in Hong Kong, is a Hong Kong government office building. The roof of the Queensway Government Office Building is adorned with a dragon logo, the symbol of Hong Kong; the structure was added in 2002.

History
The site of the office building was part of the larger Victoria Barracks site, which was transferred from the British Forces to the Hong Kong Government for redevelopment. The Victoria Barracks Planning Committee proposed building a "large secretariat building" in the vicinity of Flagstaff House, but the government instead decided to build a courthouse and the government office building on Queensway.

Contracts to construct the building were signed on 1 August 1983 by Gammon, the contractor, and the government.

Agencies
 
 Architectural Services Department
 Food and Environmental Hygiene Department

Former agencies:
 Civil Aviation Department (CAD) (46th Floor) – now located at Hong Kong International Airport

See also
List of tallest buildings in Hong Kong

References

External links

 

1985 establishments in Hong Kong
Admiralty, Hong Kong
Office buildings completed in 1985
Skyscraper office buildings in Hong Kong
Government buildings completed in 1985